The 1867 Grand National was the 29th renewal of the Grand National horse race that took place at Aintree near Liverpool, England, on 6 March 1867.

Finishing Order

Non-finishers

References

 1867
Grand National
Grand National
19th century in Lancashire
March 1867 sports events